The 1977 Virginia lieutenant gubernatorial election was held on November 8, 1977. Democratic nominee Chuck Robb defeated Republican nominee A. Joe Canada Jr. with 54.24% of the vote.

Primary elections
Primary elections were held on June 14, 1977.

Democratic primary

Candidates
Chuck Robb, attorney
Richard S. "Major" Reynolds III
Ira M. Lechner, attorney

Results

General election

Candidates
Chuck Robb, Democratic
A. Joe Canada Jr., Republican

Results

References

1977
Gubernatorial